Helen Murray Free (February 20, 1923 – May 1, 2021) was an American chemist and educator. She is most known for revolutionizing many in vitro self-testing systems for diabetes and other diseases while working at Miles Laboratories. The tests are still marketed today with blood tests as Ascensia Diabetes Care, and urine tests under Siemens Healthineers. The pioneering dip-and-read strips, allowed for testing to be more convenient and efficient, enabling doctors and patients to be less reliable to laboratories for results.

Early life and education
Free was born in Pittsburgh, Pennsylvania, on February 20, 1923. Her father, James S. Murray, worked as a coal company salesman; her mother, Daisy Piper Murray, died during an influenza epidemic when Free was six.

Free received her early education from the public schools in Youngstown, Ohio, and graduated in 1941 as the valedictorian of Poland Seminary High School. While attending a summer camp at the College of Wooster, she set her heart on attending Wooster. Greatly influenced by her high school English teacher, she originally intended to major in English and Latin in hopes of becoming a teacher; however, these plans soon changed. In December 1941 when Pearl Harbor was bombed, many young men either enlisted or were drafted into the army. As a result of the vacancy within "male-dominated disciplines", women were encouraged to pursue careers in science. Consequently, Free switched her major to chemistry in which she obtained a Bachelor of Science in 1944. She described her switch to chemistry as the “most terrific thing” that ever happened to her.

Career
Free's career search began even before completing her college education. During her final year at Wooster, she took interest in the Koppers Chemical Company in Orrville, Ohio. However, she was put down after hearing that her job would be testing the creosote that fence posts were dipped in before they were sold to local farms. She then turned to apply for a research fellowship at the Mellon Institute (which is now Carnegie Mellon University). While waiting to hear back, one of her chemistry professors arranged an interview for her at Miles Laboratories. She was offered a position, however, after hearing about what her job would entail, she was no longer interested and was set on doing research. With no response from the Mellon Institute, she reluctantly took the offer from Miles. Upon graduating from Wooster, Free immediately began working as a quality control chemist for Miles Laboratories (known as the creators of Alka-Seltzer), which involved testing the quality of ingredients in the company's line of vitamins An offer from the Mellon Institute eventually came after a few weeks she accepted the offer from Miles, but she was unfortunately locked into her position by then. Her aspiration to do research, however, was ultimately fulfilled. When Alfred Free had a position open in his biochemistry research group, she interviewed and filled the position. Little did she know that they would become lifelong research partners. They would marry two years later in 1947.

Originally they researched different antibiotics before they moved on to dry reagent systems. The first thing Alfred and his team were tasked with was further refining Clinitest to make it more sensitive. Clinitest was a tablet that measured glucose levels in the urine of diabetic patients when a diluted solution of urine was subject to a tablet. A resulting color change would be able to determine the corresponding glucose levels of the patient. The team also developed the Acetest, another tablet test for diabetes. Continuing with this trend of enabling clinical tests to be carried out in tablet form, the team created Ictotest, which tested for hepatitis A. This test was able to chemically detect the presence of bilirubin in urine, which was indicative of carrying the disease.

It was from developing the Ictotest that got the Frees thinking. Free worked with her husband to make the tests even more convenient than tablets by creating strips. The duo introduced Clinistix (the famous “dip-and-read” test) in 1956. It was the first dip-and-read diagnostic test strip for monitoring glucose in urine. They then worked to develop other strips that could test for key indicators of diseases, such as proteins and ketones. Eventually, they were able to create Multistix, which enabled a urine analysis that combined multiple tests into one strip. They did this by making an impermeable barrier between the multiple reagents on the strip. Several other testing strips were developed and added to the market, including Uristix, Ketostix, Dextrostix, Labstix, and the still-current product, Multistix.

Free moved into the Growth and Development Department in 1969, and she eventually became the director of Specialty Test Systems seven years later. She was Director of Marketing Services for the Research Products Division when Bayer Diagnostics acquired Miles in 1978.

Free also earned a Master of Arts in Management (Health Care Administration) from Central Michigan University (1978), and served as an Adjunct Professor of Management at Indiana University South Bend.

By 1975, Free had earned seven patents for her improvements in medical and clinical urinalysis testing. In that year, she and her husband co-authored their second book, Urinalysis in Laboratory Practice, which is still a standard work in the field. She retired in 1982, but continued to work as a consultant for Bayer Diagnostics in Elkhart, Indiana.

Later years
After her retirement, Free became an active promoter of science education. She has devoted special attention to educating both female and underprivileged students, through programs such as "Kids & Chemistry" and "Expanding Your Horizons."

Personal life
In 1947 she married Alfred Free, a fellow researcher in urinalysis. Together, they had six children: Eric, Kurt, Jake, Bonnie, Nina, and Penny. Also, she helped raise three stepchildren: Charles, Jane and Barb.

Free died on May 1, 2021, at a hospice facility in Elkhart at 98 from complications of a stroke.

Awards and honors
In 1980, Free received the Garvan–Olin Medal, given to women for distinguished service in the field of chemistry. In 1996, she received the Kilby Award for lifetime achievement.

Free served as president of the American Association for Clinical Chemistry in 1990. Sixteen years later, she received its prestigious award for Outstanding Contributions to Clinical Chemistry.

Free was elected president of the American Chemical Society in 1993. As president, she considered her top priority to be to raise public awareness of the positive role chemistry has played in our lives. The ACS named an award in her honor, the Helen M. Free Award in Public Outreach.

Free was inducted into the National Inventor's Hall of Fame in 2000. She was awarded the National Medal of Technology and Innovation a decade later by Barack Obama.

The work of Helen and Al Free in developing diagnostic test strips was designated a National Historic Chemical Landmark by the American Chemical Society on May 1, 2010, at the ETHOS Science Center in Elkhart, Indiana. She was inducted into the National Women's Hall of Fame one year later.

Patents 
Free et al., U.S. Patent 3,087,794, " CHEMICAL TEST FOR DIFFERENTIATING LEUCOCYTES FROM ERYTHROCYTES"
Free, U.S. Patent 2,912,309, “INDICATOR FOR DETECTING GLUCOSE”

References

Further reading

External links
 
 

1923 births
2021 deaths
20th-century American inventors
21st-century American chemists
American women chemists
Central Michigan University alumni
College of Wooster alumni
People from Youngstown, Ohio
Recipients of the Garvan–Olin Medal
Scientists from Pittsburgh
Women inventors
21st-century American women scientists